Missouri's second congressional district is in the eastern portion of the state, primarily consisting of the suburbs south and west of St. Louis, including Arnold, Town and Country, Wildwood, Chesterfield, and Oakville. The district includes portions of St. Louis, Jefferson and St. Charles counties. Following redistricting in 2010, the St. Louis Post-Dispatch reported that the district now included more Democratic-leaning voters than it had its 2001–2010 boundaries, but still leaned Republican as a whole. The latest U.S. Census Electorate Profile for the 2nd congressional district estimates there are 581,131 citizens of voting age living in 293,984 households. A primarily suburban district, MO-02 is the wealthiest of Missouri's congressional districts.

Its current representative is Republican Ann Wagner. Wagner faced Democrat Jill Schupp and Libertarian Martin Schulte in the 2020 general election.

List of members representing the district

Election results from presidential races

Election results

1998

2000

2002

2004

2006

2008

2010

2012

2014

2016

2018

2020

See also

Missouri's congressional districts
List of United States congressional districts

References

 
 
 Congressional Biographical Directory of the United States 1774–present
 US Census Bureau

02
Constituencies established in 1847
1847 establishments in Missouri
Constituencies disestablished in 1933
1933 disestablishments in Missouri
Constituencies established in 1935
1935 establishments in Missouri